Černý potok ("black stream") is the name of a number of minor rivers in the Czech Republic:
Černý potok (Smědá)
tributary of Úhlava
tributary of Müglitz (river)
tributary of Radbuza

See also
List of rivers of the Czech Republic
Schwarzwasser (disambiguation)